WKOB-LD, virtual channel 42 (VHF digital channel 13), is an affiliate of the Vision Latina (Spanish-language) television network licensed to New York, New York, United States (alongside W16CC-D in the Miami market). The station is owned and operated by HC2 Holdings.

History

as W53AA (1973-1996)
This station was signed on over UHF channel 53 in the 1970s by its original owner CBS Inc. as W53AA. It was one of multiple Television Broadcast Translators in New York City which operated at the upper end of the UHF band in order to provide reliable coverage to certain New York boroughs whose reception was ultimately compromised by construction of the World Trade Center. This translator station relayed the signal of WCBS-TV, which for decades prior and at that time operated over VHF channel 2.

Originally, most of the New York City television stations operated their main transmitters from the Empire State Building. However, reliable reception was ultimately compromised for some viewers once the majority of the World Trade Center was constructed, thus necessitating the use of the UHF translators. In response, nearly all of the TV stations, including WCBS-TV, relocated to the North Tower of the World Trade Center in 1975. CBS, however, maintained an auxiliary transmitter back at Empire.

CBS eventually sold the station on July 15, 1987, to Accord Communications, Inc.  Accord, who purchased W53AA as an investment and intended to sell it for a profit, improved the station by relocating its transmitter to the Empire State Building and increasing its transmitting power to 7.2 kW.

Accord sold W53AA on October 6, 1989, to Pan-Asian Communications, Inc. whose president was Andrew H. Ohm, a major figure in Korean media in the United States. Ohm established the Korea Broadcasting Corp. (KBC) over W53AA, the first Korean-owned television station in the United States. The station's emphasis was on Asian language programming and broadcast throughout the New York metropolitan area.

As WKOB-LP/LD (1996-present)
On February 19, 1996, the call-sign was changed to WKOB-LP.

On June 1, 1998, WKOB filed a displacement application to move to channel 48 due to the impending WFUT operation on Channel 53.

In the late 1990s, programming was leased and consisted of religious programs and infomercials.

According to WKOB, in a filing to the FCC, the station had broadcast programming 24 hours a day under a time brokerage agreement with Paxson Communications LPTV, Inc. until August 31, 1999. The station then went silent because its time brokerage programming agreement expired.  WKOB notified the FCC on September 17, 1999, that the station was back on the air with a "limited" amount of programming.  WKOB-LP also stated that it had obtained locally-produced programming targeted to the needs of the Korean residents of New York City, and asserted that this specialized programming service supported an award of Class A status, which it was ultimately denied.

WRNN-TV strongly objected to any operation that could interfere with channel 48, as they had been assigned this channel for their Kingston, New York operation. In fact, WRNN-TV's owners took the unusual step to back up their opposition by monitoring WKOB-LP for 39 days between April 28 and August 22, 2000. They hired a Korean language interpreter, and based upon the transcripts provided by that interpreter, and their visual review of the programming, they determined the majority of the programs observed were religious services conducted in churches located in Korea. In its August 10, 2001, reply to WRNN-TV's opposition, WKOB-LP provided additional information regarding its programming, explaining that the programming is produced in New York, and edited in WKOB-LP's studio, and contended that if a Class A station cannot incorporate footage shot outside its service area in a locally produced program, then "a local newscast would not get credit for local time during a news story on an address by the President in Washington." WKOB also asserted that "its historical record of all-day programming coupled with its record of local service to the Korean minority community in New York justifies an exercise of the discretion granted to the Commission by the [CBPA] to act in the public interest."

The FCC ultimately denied both the application for review filed by WKOB Communications, Inc., and dismissed the opposition filed by WRNN-TV Associates Limited Partnership describing it as "moot".

In the early 2000s, the station owner began to suffer financial problems. It went into receivership in 2001, and a voluntary sale was attempted but fell through, leading to a lawsuit with the buyer. Financial problems still loomed, and the station ultimately requested Special Temporary Authority to go silent in January 2005.

Ohm sold the station to Nave Communications LLC on May 13, 2005, for $1,250,000. Under its new ownership, the station shortly thereafter became an Almavision affiliate in 2006. In Late-2006, Almavision programming ceased on the station, and was replaced by DayStar programming, which is still broadcasting to this day.

The station was displaced from Channel 53 to Channel 42 due to the FCC granting WFUT channel 53 for its pre-transition digital operations.

This station was originally signed on in the 1970s by CBS, Inc. In late 2008, Nave was uncertain if there would be any room left for its WKOB operation on the much smaller television band due to the DTV transition. Its attempt to secure Class A status and securing a spot on Channel 48 were both thwarted by WRNN-TV, and its Low Power classification relegated it to a secondary status. Making matters worse, its Channel 42 operation was predicted to cause interference to full power WSAH Bridgeport, if their pending application to broadcast on Channel 41 from the Empire State Building was approved. That application was ultimately denied due to unacceptable interference to WXTV-DT Paterson.

Desperate and with few alternatives, Nave turned to CBS, Inc., asking if they would object to WKOB-LP requesting displacement to WCBS-TV's analog channel position at Channel 2. CBS, which ultimately selected Channel 33 for their post-transition operations, did not object and signed a Waiver Of Consent, ultimately accepting whatever interference a WKOB-LP operation over Channel 2 would have presented to WCBS-TV. On January 21, 2009, the Request for Displacement was approved.

WKOB-LP, however, did not commence operations on Channel 2 until seven months after WCBS-TV signed off Channel 2 for the final time in July 2009. The station finally began operations on RF Channel 2 on March 7, 2010, as WKOB-LD New York.

WKOB-LD once had a construction permit to broadcast a digital signal on channel 59 at 400 watts, which has since been modified to specify operation on channel 2 with 300 watts, the latter of which is on the air as of February 2010. The station subsequently filed an Application For Displacement to move its digital signal back to channel 42. The station has filed this application for the following reason:

The application has been granted and there is an outstanding construction permit to build-out a transmitter facility for a Channel 42 operation, however Nave has not completed the build-out.

In June 2013, WKOB-LD was slated to be sold to Landover 5 LLC as part of a larger deal involving 51 other low-power television stations; the sale fell through in June 2016. Nave Broadcasting sold WKOB-LD to HC2 Holdings in 2017.

Digital television 
The station's digital channel is multiplexed:

Digital channels

Subchannel history
LATV was added as a sub-channel around October 18, 2010. This was the second time LATV appeared in the New York City market. It first appeared as a sub-channel on WPIX, but was dropped just prior to that station adding This TV as a sub-channel. The addition of LATV as a sub-channel on WKOB-LD marked the second time a diginet was dropped by one station and later appeared over another in this Television market; Azteca América was the first, having relocated from WNYN-LD 39.4 to WMBC-TV 63.6. LATV later secured carriage over WBQM-LD.

The LATV affiliation over WKOB-LD ended after one week, however, as Daystar programming had returned to 42.1 and remains on 42.2.

January 12–19, 2011: WKOB-LD was apparently planning to add Tuff TV on 42.4. A Test Pattern/Standard Color Bars is on this sub-channel with text reading as follows: Line 1: "TUFF TV" static, Line 2: "TUFF TV" blinking. This same day, a fifth sub-channel appeared for the first time on WKOB-LD, channel 42.5. A Test Pattern/Standard Color Bars is on this sub-channel with text reading as follows: Line 1: "WKOB-LP SD5" static, Line 2: "WKOB-LP" blinking. Until 1/12/11, this text appeared on 42.4, with the appropriate corresponding SD#. On January 19, 2011, WKOB-LD added Tuff TV on 42.4.

March 1, 2011: Daystar programming has been removed from 42.1. The stream remains live, but no A/V content is being transmitted. Daystar remains on 42.2.

March 9, 2011: Daystar programming was returned to 42.1. WKOB-LD has added WizeBuys TV on 42.5. WizeBuys TV is a 24/7 national television network delivering both short and long form Direct Response advertising. It reaches over 30 million homes per day, including 15 of the top 20 DMAs that deliver an ever-growing audience. It is owned by The Cross Group, a subsidiary of Philadelphia based Cross MediaWorks.

During the final week of March 2011, an STL problem existed where only the aural portion of Tuff TV could be received and re-broadcast by WKOB. On March 30, 2011, Tuff TV has all but been dropped from WKOB. The PSIP still identified 42.4 as Tuff TV through late June, and about once an hour, a technical issue still exists where the Tuff TV audio can be heard for about two seconds when the new programming service briefly interrupts for station ID.

March 31, 2011: WKOB-LD has added HOT TV: History Of Television on 42.4. HOT TV is a classic TV station featuring TV shows and movies from the 1940s through the early 1960s.

June 2011:  Daystar on channel 42.1 was replaced by color bars with a reference to GBC, and no further details.  Daystar continues on 42.2.  A few days later, infomercials appear on channel 42.1.

July 2, 2011:  GBC World News was added to channel 42.1 at 8 AM.

August 2011:  GBC World News ceased operations, leaving a blank screen and no sound on 42.1

September 2011: WizeBuy moved from 42.5 to 42.1 to replace the vacated space left by the demise of GBC, 42.5 deactivated

September 26, 2011: Retro Television Network (RTV) affiliation canceled. Replaced immediately with WKOB 42.3 24/7 Movie Network. This new station is locally produced and consists of 1930s through 1960s public domain movies.

October 22, 2011: 24/7 Movie Network shifted to 42.1, HOT to 42.3 and WizeBuy to 42.4.  WKOB also has an ad running stating that they are hiring salespersons for HOT TV 42.3.

November 25, 2011: The 24/7 Movie Network 42.1 has been removed and replaced by Mundo Hispano TV based out of Bloomfield, NJ. This station had formerly aired over WMBC-TV Newton, Channel 63-4. HOT 42.3 is off the air (running test color bars) and 42.4 is running 24/7 infomercials. Daystar remains active on 42.2.

January 24, 2012: Telos Alternative Health Network was added to WKOB-LD, Channel 42-1. The stations website describes Telos as: A Digital Television Network designed to present alternatives to traditional medicine.

Prior to the Telos addition, channel 42-1, labeled "24-7" via PSIP to reflect the WKOB 24/7 Movie Network, was airing an EBR Test Pattern without audio duplicating the one which has been airing over 42-3 since November 2011.

February 4, 2012: HOT TV: History Of Television returned to WKOB-LD, Channel 42-3.

March 16, 2012: WKOB-LD adds sub-channels 42-5 and 42-6. This marks the first time ever that WKOB-LD has added a sixth sub-channel. Both channels are labeled "WKOB-LD" via PSIP and are each airing an EBR Test Pattern without audio. However, for approximately two minutes beginning at 4:37AM EDT. on March 17, 2012, audio was transmitted for the first time over both 42-5 and 42-6. The audio was from Telos TV which airs over 42-1, and this same audio feed aired over all six sub-channels during this two-minute interval. After which, audio content was restored to normal over all channels.

PSIP channel names were also adjusted on March 16, 2012. "DayStar" was changed to "Daystar" and "HOT TV" was changed to "HOT".

August 2012: SonLife Broadcasting Network (SBN) was added to WKOB-LD, Channel 42-5. The stations website describes SBN as: a television and radio network that is broadcast around the world 24/7. SBN is an extension of Jimmy Swaggart Ministries and offers live church services as well as programs hosted by Evangelist Jimmy Swaggart, Frances Swaggart, Evangelist Donnie Swaggart, Gabriel Swaggart, and more. The goal of SonLife Broadcasting Network is to reach the world with the Message of the Cross.

September 1, 2012: Telos Alternative Health Network and HOT TV are not being carried over WKOB-LD, despite the TVCT information reflecting their continued occupancy. An EBR Test Pattern without Audio is presently airing on those subchannels.

September 15, 2012: Almavision was added to WKOB-LD, Channel 42-6. The network is an American television network broadcasting Christian programming in Spanish with affiliates across North and Central America. Their slogan is "Television Cristiana...a la manera de Dios. " ("Christian television... in God's way.") and Comprometidos con la verdad "committed to the truth". This is the second time Almavision has aired over WKOB, the first time being shortly after Nave Communications, its present owners, first purchased the station.

December 2012: Punch TV was added to WKOB-LD, Channel 42-3. "Punch TV is an urban programming experience that brings together a unique type of programming that reflects the tastes, preferences, hues, and nationalities of the new urban American – a population that includes Caucasians, African Americans, Latinos, Asians, Native Americans and citizenry of mixed ethnicity's." Until the network's actual launch, a still-slide showing the children's animated series Filbert's Big Bash with a "Happy Holidays!" banner atop was displayed with a message at bottom which read: "P-TV Coming Soon!" Actual Punch TV programming began on December 26, 2012.

January 2013: Cubana Television added over primary WKOB-LD, Channel 42-1. The affiliation lasted approximately one month.

April 20, 2013: Punch TV affiliation discontinued. Peace TV immediately launched over Channel 42-3.

July 2013: Soul of the South added on 42-1.

November 3, 2014: An EBR Test Pattern without audio replaces Soul of the South, which has since commenced airing over WDVB-CD 23.2.

December 1, 2014: WKOB-LD adds sub-channel 42-7. This marks the first time ever that WKOB-LD has added a seventh sub-channel. Rev'n, launched on December 1, 2014, at 5:00PM EDT. by Luken Communications, is a new network for automotive performance enthusiasts featuring programming focused on cars, trucks, motorcycles, boats, ATVs, snowmobiles, events, auctions and more.

December 9, 2014: Retro TV replaces Rev'n on WKOB-LD sub-channel 42-7.

March 2015: IQRA TV was added to 42.1. IQRA TV was acquired in 2009 by the Al-Khair Foundation. That foundation describes the station as "one of the premier broadcasters of quality Islamic-based programmes. IQRA TV is distributed worldwide to Muslims and Non-Muslims alike, with informative and educational programmes." Prior to the addition of IQRA TV, 42.1 was not carrying actual programming since Soul of the South Network departed WKOB-LD in November 2014; An EBR Test Pattern without audio served as a placeholder in the interim.

Simultaneously in March 2015, MiCasa Network was added to 42.6. MiCasa Network is the premiere provider of entertainment for the evolving Latino-American community, offering comedies, music, news, reality, sports, politics, and lifestyle entertainment in English with a distinct Latino flavor.  With over 350 hours of original programming shot in its state-of-the-art HD virtual production studios and 1,500 hours of licensed programming, MiCasa Network offers fresh and original entertainment for today's Latino-American community. As a result, ONTV4U, an Hispanic infomercial diginet which had occupied 42.6, was removed from the WKOB-LD sub-channel lineup.

ONTV4U reappeared on channel 42.8 in June 2015.

By December 2020, Almavision on 42.6 was replaced by a simulcast of Port Jervis-licensed WASA-LD.

By November 2021, OnTV4U on 42.8 was replaced by Novelisima.

Somewhere around 2022, all subchannels except for Azteca got replaced with BeIN Sports Xtra en Español on DT2 and the classics network Timeless TV. Later on in November, DT3 began airing more infomercials.

References

External links

KOB-LD
Low-power television stations in the United States
Television channels and stations established in 1970
Innovate Corp.